Adesoji O. Adelaja (born February 20, 1956) is an academic and John A. Hannah Distinguished Professor in Land Policy at Michigan State University.

A native of Lagos born in 1956, Adelaja attended Pennsylvania State University in the United States, where he received his B.S. and pursued graduate study at West Virginia University, receiving two M.S. degrees and his Ph.D. Upon completing his doctorate, Adelaja taught at Idaho State University for a year, then joined the faculty of Rutgers University in 1986, later becoming Executive Dean. He became John A. Hannah Distinguished Professor in Land Policy at Michigan State University in 2004. In 2018, the West Virginia University School of Business inducted Adelaja into its Roll of Distinguished Alumni.

Early life and education

Education

Pennsylvania State University
Adelaja received his B.S. in Agricultural Mechanization in the class of 1978 at Pennsylvania State University.

West Virginia University
In 1980, Adelaja received his M.S. in Agricultural Economics from the Davis College of WVU. In 1981, he received his M.A. in Economics from the College of Business of WVU. In 1985, he received his PH.D. in Economics from the College of Business of WVU.

Academic career

Idaho State University
In 1985, Adelaja joined the faculty at Idaho State University as an Assistant Professor in Economics. He served as an economic adviser to the Shoshone Bannock Native American tribe at the Fort Hall reservation. As an economic adviser he played a large part in increasing grazing revenues, defining their water rights and developing tribal enterprises and tax ordinances.

Rutgers University
In 1986, Adelaja joined the faculty as an Assistant Professor in the Department of Agricultural, Food and Resource Economics (AFRE) at Rutgers University. In 1993, he founded and served as the Director for the Rutgers Ecopolicy Center (ECOPOL). By 1996, he had been appointed Chair of AFRE. In 1997, he served as the Director for and founded the Rutgers Food Policy Institute. In 1999, he founded the Rutgers Food Innovation Center, a center that still serves the Southern New Jersey economy. He was appointed to many state boards and commissions as well as serving as an adviser to the offices of Governors McGreevey and Whitman. In 1999, Soji was appointed as the Dean of Research of the New Jersey Agricultural Experiment Station (NJAES). "After, he quickly rose to Dean of Cook College, Executive Director of the New Jersey Experiment Station (NJAES), and Executive Dean of Agriculture and Natural Resources." As the Executive Dean of Agriculture and Natural Resources, Soji oversaw Rutgers University's largest research unit and a massive college that included 21 extension offices, 18 centers and institutes, 14 departments and 10 research stations. He retired from Rutgers in 2004.

Michigan State University
In 2004, Adelaja joined the faculty at Michigan State University.

Personal life
Adelaja resides in Okemos, Michigan with his wife Frances Adelaja. He has three children, Angel (an entrepreneur based in Abuja, Nigeria), Evan II (an economist) and Beniah II (an economist based in Chicago).

Awards and honors

"In recognition of his service at Rutgers, Soji received several Excellence in Research awards, an Excellence in Outreach award, two Team Awards for Excellence, the Presidential Award for Distinguished Public Service, an Award from the New Jersey Legislature for outstanding contributions to the Garden State and a special recognition from Governor James McGreevey for his contribution to the development of the State of New Jersey.  In 2004, Soji was honored as the George Hammell Cook Emeritus Executive Dean and Professor in recognition of his service to the university and the state."

Publications

References

1956 births
Living people
Penn State College of Agricultural Sciences alumni
West Virginia University alumni
Idaho State University faculty
Rutgers University faculty
Michigan State University faculty
Nigerian expatriate academics in the United States
Educators from Lagos